Gregori I. Warchavchik (April 2, 1896 – July 27, 1972) was a Jewish-Brazilian architect.

Warchavchik was born in Odessa, Ukraine which was then a part of the Russian Empire. He began his architectural studies at Odessa University and moved to Rome in 1918 to study at the Accademia di Belle Arti di Roma, the Superior Institute of Fine Arts. He graduated in 1920 and worked as an assistant to the architect Marcello Piacentini (1881-1960), later known as the main proponent of Fascist architecture in Italy.

Warchavchik arrived in Brazil in 1923. He married Mina Klabin in 1927, daughter of a prominent industrialist in São Paulo, and became a naturalized Brazilian. His house in São Paulo, Casa da Rua Santa Cruz, built between 1927 and 1928, is considered the first modernist residence in Brazil. He designed the Lasar Segall Museum in São Paulo that opened in 1967. In 1930 he and Lucio Costa established a joint architecture studio in Rio de Janeiro, and one of the designers in the studio between 1932 and 1936 was the then young architectural student, Oscar Niemeyer.

Warchavchik died in São Paulo in 1972.

Works

1927 - Casa da Rua Santa Cruz, São Paulo    
1929 - Casa Modernista, Tomé de Sousa Street, São Paulo
1930 - Casa Modernista, Itápolis Street, São Paulo
 - Casa Modernista, Bahia Street, São Paulo
1931 - Casa Modernista do Rio, Rio de Janeiro
1932 - Casa Lasar Segall, now the Museum of Lasar Segall
1933 - Residência Duarte Coelho, Rio de Janeiro
 - Vila Operária da Gamboa, Rio de Janeiro

See also 

 Centro Cultural e de Estudos Superiores Aúthos Pagano

References

Brazilian architects
20th-century Brazilian architects
1896 births
1972 deaths
Architects from Odesa
Naturalized citizens of Brazil
Odesa Jews
Emigrants from the Russian Empire to Italy